Haplocochlias turbinus is a species of sea snail, a marine gastropod mollusk in the family Skeneidae.

Description
The height of the shell attains 3.3 mm. The small, thin shell has a subconic shape with four rounded whorls and a minute glassy nucleus. The radiating sculpture consists of fine oblique incremental lines, which on the early whorls rise into very fine threads, visible crossing the interspaces of the spiral sculpture. The spiral sculpture consists of (on the body whorl) about seven strong smooth even cinguli on the top of the whorl, and fourteen or fifteen more rather smaller from the periphery to the brink of the umbilicus. There are also a few finer ones, especially three near the suture, and occasionally some spiral striation is faintly indicated. On the top of the whorl the interspaces are about twice as wide as the threads, but not so wide on the base. The whorls, the periphery and the base are evenly rounded. The suture is distinct and not channelled. The umbilicus is perforate, with smoothish walls. The aperture is half as high as the shell. It is oblique, nearly circular, with sharp, simple, slightly expanded edges.

Distribution
This species occurs in the Caribbean Sea and the Gulf of Mexico; in the Atlantic Ocean off North Carolina at depths between 70 m and 146 m.

References

External links

turbinus
Gastropods described in 1889